Marinda Petersson (born 3 February 1995) is a Swedish hammer thrower. She competed in the women's hammer throw at the 2017 World Championships in Athletics.

References

External links

1995 births
Living people
Swedish female hammer throwers
World Athletics Championships athletes for Sweden
Place of birth missing (living people)